The FAZ Women Super Division is the highest league of women’s football in Zambia. It was established in the beginning of 2021 and is run by FAZ. The inaugural season features 12 teams from four provinces in Zambia. The super division replaced the 4 regional women's leagues (Copperbelt, Lusaka, North-west and Central) as the highest level of women’s football in Zambia, while the regional leagues dropped to the second tier.

The teams for the first season of the super division were selected from an application process where FAZ granted spots in the league for fully structured teams that were expected to be able to complete the full season. The creation of the league came from a wider promotion of the women’s game in a promising era of Zambian women’s football with the Copper Queens qualified for the Tokyo Olympic games. It was also a response to the newly announced CAF Women's Champions League, where the best teams of the continent will compete, starting later in 2021.

Past champions

The Women's Football League in Zambia dates back to the beginning of the 1980s when women competed in Copperbelt province. The national league began in January 1984, according to RSSSF, with teams "mostly from Copperbelt towns: Luanshya, Mufulira (Mufulira Flying Queens), Kitwe (Kitwe Flying Angels), Ndola, Kalulushi, Chililabombwe (Konkola Blades) and Chingola."

The Football Association of Zambia became involved in the national league held from 1999 for a few seasons, and the Lusaka Zambia Women Football Championship Cup was held from 2005–2007.

In the beginning of the 90s Copperbelt football died out while it instead was introduced in Lusaka at the end of the decade and Kabwata EDUSPORT United was an early dominant of the game. Since then, women have competed in various competitions, predominantly in the Copperbelt and Lusaka, with the following champions:

First national championship final played between Copperbelt champion and Lusaka champion
Green Buffaloes Women won the Inaugural Charity Shield 2019 (played between 2018 champions in Copperbelt and Lusaka province league) over Indeni Roses and was announced national champions 2018
First national championship play-offs played between province league champions from Copperbelt, Lusaka, North-west, and Central.

Super Division champions

Clubs in the 2021 season
The first ever national league will start on the 20th of March and are contested by the following 14 clubs:

Follow the league standings on this external link.

Regional Leagues

The second level of Zambian women's football, under the Super Division, FAZ is running regional leagues in six different provinces. All regional leagues started their 2021 campaign on the 20th of February.

Central
The following 12 teams are competing in the 2021 edition of the Central league Zone A:

Bwatcha Pirates Girls
Chesiz Queens
Young Riders Girls
Chindwin Academy Queens
Driven Queens
Sable Nue Girls
Kabwe Celtic Queens
Katondo Queens
Prison Leopards Queens
Ngalande Queens
Makululu Girls
Unstoppable Queens

The following 10 teams are competing in the 2021 edition of the Central league Zone B:

Mukonchi Swallows Queens
Kapiri Glass Factory
Green Leaf Queens
Ndeke Warriors Queens
Turn Off Queens
Kapiri United Girls
Mountain Rangers Queens
Lenchester Women Youth
Power Farmers Queens
Mpula Queens

Copperbelt
The following 10 teams are competing in the 2021 edition of the Copperbelt league:

Moba Queens
Kalulushi Blue Angels
Beanal Women
Kitwe Girls Academy
Miracle Rangers
Super stars Queens
Konkola Blades Queens
Luanshya Municipal Council
Ministry of Health N.Starts
Ella Bondwell Queens

Eastern
The following 10 teams are competing in the 2021 edition of the Eastern league:

Chipata Girls
Eastern Queens
Panza Queens
Chadiza Council Queens
Chadiza Z.P. Queens
Muchenga Queens
Kanjala United Queens
Valley Queens
Smiling Kids Queens
Genesis United Queens

Lusaka
The following 16 teams are competing in the 2021 edition of the Lusaka league:

Twikatane Queens
Football Chance Foundation
Kings Sports (Girls)
Garden Youth
Green Eagles Women
Misisi Queens United
Chibolya Sports Academy
Kafue Celtic Queens
Lusaka Queens
Lusaka Red Lions Women
ZISD Queens
Luyando Foundation
Mapani Queens
Progress Sports
Pataaki Queens
National Assembly Women
Napsa Stars Queens
Zanaco Queens

Transferred to the National Super Division shortly before season start.
Joined when the open spot occurred in week 7
Joined when the open spot occurred in week 8

Northern
The following 12 teams are competing in the 2021 edition of the Northern league (started on 20 March):

Hope Queens
Kasama United Queens
ZNS Green Eagles
Merceds United
Malole Systemisers
Young Musport
Mpaji Queens
Spear Girls
Pride Stars Girls
Mungwi Hotspurs
Susan Golden Stars
Munthali Queens

Southern
The following 10 teams are competing in the 2021 edition of the Southern (Livingstone District) league:

Eastlands Queens
Girl Power
Southlands Ajax
Libuyu United
Mandiya Radiants
Simoonga United
Randers
Maramba Queens
Mukuni Rockets United
Play It Forward Queens

The following 8 teams are competing in the 2021 edition of the Southern (Choma District) league:

Choma Cabinet Stars
Barts Queens
Black Swans
Choma Warriors Academy
Musports Academy
Super Rangers
Red Jetters
Pemba Queens

The following 10 teams are competing in the 2021 edition of the Southern (Mazabuka District) league:

Green Land Queens
Rosangela Queens
Magobo Queens
FC Muza Queens
Red Lion Queens
Kaleya Queens
Don Bosco Queens
Naluama Queens
Ndeke Lion Queens
Penny Evans Queens

References

Zambia
Football leagues in Zambia
Women's sport in Zambia